Crafts is a surname. Notable people with the surname include:

Alden Springer Crafts (1897–1990), American botanist
Clayton E. Crafts (1848–1920), American politician
Dale J. Crafts (born 1958), American politician
Helle Crafts (1947–1986), American murder victim
James Crafts (1839–1917), American chemist
Jerry Crafts (born 1968), American footballer
Lisa Crafts (21st century), American artist
Nicholas Crafts (born 1949), British historian
Samuel C. Crafts (1768–1853), American politician
Sara Jane Crafts (1845–1930), American social reformer, author, educator

See also
Craft (surname)